Ipiduropoda is a genus of mites in the family Trematuridae.

Species
 Ipiduropoda angusta (Hirschmann & Wisniewski, 1986)     
 Ipiduropoda australis (Hirschmann, 1972)     
 Ipiduropoda californica (Wisniewski & Hirschmann, 1988)     
 Ipiduropoda camerunis (Wisniewski, 1980)     
 Ipiduropoda cornuimbergerensis (Hirschmann & Wisniewski, 1986)     
 Ipiduropoda dalarnaensis (Hirschmann & Zirngiebl-Nicol, 1961)     
 Ipiduropoda durangoensis (Hirschmann, 1978)     
 Ipiduropoda galica (Hirschmann & Wisniewski, 1986)     
 Ipiduropoda hondurasae (Hirschmann & Wisniewski, 1986)     
 Ipiduropoda idahoensis (Hirschmann & Wisniewski, 1986)     
 Ipiduropoda integra (Hirschmann, 1978)     
 Ipiduropoda kielczewskii (Wisniewski, 1977)     
 Ipiduropoda knoxvillensis (Hirschmann & Wisniewski, 1986)     
 Ipiduropoda montanae (Hirschmann & Wisniewski, 1986)     
 Ipiduropoda multipilis (Vitzthum, 1923)     
 Ipiduropoda nevesi (Hirschmann & Wisniewski, 1986)     
 Ipiduropoda polonica (Wisniewski & Hirschmann, 1988)     
 Ipiduropoda polycanadiensis (Hirschmann, 1978)     
 Ipiduropoda polycolumbiensis (Hirschmann, 1978)     
 Ipiduropoda polyguatemalae (Hirschmann & Wisniewski, 1986)     
 Ipiduropoda polymexicana (Hirschmann, 1978)     
 Ipiduropoda polytricha (Vitzthum, 1923)     
 Ipiduropoda polytrichasimilis (Hirschmann, 1972)     
 Ipiduropoda tegucigalpae (Hirschmann & Wisniewski, 1986)     
 Ipiduropoda wisniewskii (Hirschmann, 1978)

References

Mesostigmata